Salah Zulfikar (1926–1993) was an Egyptian actor and film producer, who appeared in over 100 feature films, several short films, stage, television and radio serials. Zulfikar's film debut was in 1956 in a leading role becoming one of the most dominant leading men in Egyptian cinema. He starred in action, crime, war, drama, horror, romance, and romantic comedies. 

Salah Zulfikar's film debut was in Wakeful Eyes (1956) alongside Shadia, and his successful career in film lasted into the 1990s. His film production career started in 1958, and he produced fourteen feature films. On the stage, Zulfikar's debut was in 1964’s A Bullet in the Heart based on Tawfik El Hakim’s novel, alongside Laila Taher. Afterwards, he starred in more than twenty plays in Cairo theatres.

Zulfikar participated in over 250 artistic projects either cinematic, televised, radio or stage. He was a film producer and film, stage, television, and radio actor.

Salah Zulfikar produced five films and starred in ten, two of which as an actor and a producer with a total of thirteen films listed in the greatest 100 films in the centenary of Egyptian cinema. Zulfikar played all kind of roles in an impressive career spanning over thirty seven years.

Feature films

Selected works

Short films

Theater

Television

Selected works

As Producer

See also 
 Egyptian cinema
Lists of Egyptian films
CIFF Top 100 Egyptian films

References 

Male actor filmographies
Egyptian filmographies